Greg Heiar (born August 14, 1975) is an American basketball coach who is the former head coach of the New Mexico State Aggies men's basketball team.

Playing career
Heiar played college basketball for two seasons at Kirkwood Community College under Chris Jans, whom he succeeded as head coach at New Mexico State 25 years later. Heiar completed his playing career at Mount St. Clare, where he was a two-year captain, all-conference selection and team MVP.

Coaching career
After graduation, Heiar assisted his alma mater for one season before joining the coaching staff at Loras College. He reunited with Jans at NJCAA institution Chipola College as an assistant coach for a season, before being elevated to the head coaching position. He coached at Chipola from 2004 to 2009, compiling a 164–15 record. After earning numerous coach of the year honors and a third-place finish in the 2009 NJCAA Tournament, Heiar joined Larry Eustachy's staff at Southern Miss. In 2011, he joined the coaching staff of Gregg Marshall at Wichita State. At WSU, he was a part of seven NCAA tournament squads, including the Shockers' 2013 Final Four appearance. After Wichita, Heiar served as an assistant coach to Will Wade at LSU 2017-2020. Heiar departed from LSU and served a one-year assistant coaching stint at East Tennessee State under coach Jason Shay. In 2021, Heiar returned to the junior college ranks, taking over at Northwest Florida State College, where his team won the NJCAA Division national tournament with a 31–5 record.

On March 27, 2022, Heiar was named the 27th head coach in New Mexico State men's basketball history, succeeding Jans, who had accepted the head coaching position at Mississippi State.

On November 19, 2022, Coach Heiar and his coaching staff were involved in the police response when one of his athletes, Mike Peake, was attacked in a premeditated plan by four University of New Mexico (UNM) students, resulting in the death of one of the UNM freshman students. The featured rivalry basketball game was canceled and the team returned to Las Cruces.

On  February 10, 2023, Heiar and his staff were placed on administrative leave and the men’s basketball program was suspended until further notice after New Mexico State University announced an internal investigation for unspecified violations. It was later revealed that one of Heiar's players claimed to have been hazed by his teammates. As a result of the investigation, the men’s basketball program was suspended for the remainder of the season.  On February 14, 2023, Heiar was fired as head coach.

Head coaching record

NCAA D1

NJCAA

References

Living people
1975 births
American men's basketball coaches
New Mexico State Aggies men's basketball coaches
Southern Miss Golden Eagles basketball coaches
Wichita State Shockers men's basketball coaches
LSU Tigers basketball coaches
East Tennessee State Buccaneers men's basketball coaches
Sportspeople from Dubuque, Iowa
Basketball coaches from Iowa